The Scottish National Investment Bank is a Scottish state-owned investment and national development bank based in Edinburgh, Scotland. Although referred to as a bank, it does not do normal banking operations nor accepts deposits. The bank uses public money to fund commercial projects across Scotland with the hope that this seed capital will encourage further private investment, to help develop a fairer, more sustainable economy. £2 Billion of taxpayers money is earmarked for the bank.

The bank is a public corporation,
with the only shareholder being the Scottish Government. It reports to the Cabinet Secretary for Finance and the Economy.

History
The bank was announced in September 2017 in the First Minister Nicola Sturgeon's 2017 Programme for Government. Benny Higgins was appointed as a strategic adviser, to oversee the organisation launching. In February 2018 an implementation plan was launched. The Scottish National Investment Bank Act 2020 was passed by Parliament on 21 January 2020. The Act legally obliged Scottish Ministers to establish a National Investment Bank for Scotland as both a public body and a publicly limited company. The bank was formally launched in November 2020.

In February 2022 the chief executive Eilidh MacTaggart left her £235,000 a year job abruptly. Despite being questioned about the departure in the Scottish Parliament, First Minister Nicola Sturgeon refused to provide a reason for it.  In an escalating row Douglas Ross criticised the Scottish Government's "secrecy and shutting down of scrutiny". He added that the timing of Ms MacTaggart's departure was "very suspicious". The departure coincided with launch of the Scottish National Party and Scottish Green Party Coalition Government's new National Strategy for Economic Transformation which would direct the focus of future investments made by the bank. Ms MacTaggart subsequently insisted she left the bank for personal reasons,  and she received £117,500 upon departure in lieu of having to work her notice period due under the terms of her contract.

Activities
The bank seeks to invest in businesses, projects and communities across Scotland, with its investment targeted to support three main aims:
Supporting Scotland's transition to net-zero carbon emissions by 2045
Building communities and promoting equality by 2040
Harnessing innovation to enable our people to flourish by 2040

The bank has an initial budget of £2 billion for the first 10 years of its existence (2020–2030).

Portfolio

References

2020 establishments in Scotland
Banks of Scotland
Public corporations of the Scottish Government
European investment banks